Contemplative psychotherapy is an approach to psychotherapy that includes the use of personal contemplative practices and insights informed by the spiritual tradition of Buddhism.  Contemplative psychotherapy differs from other, more traditional methods of counseling in that the therapist brings to the therapeutic relationship qualities of mindfulness and compassion in order to help clients access their fundamental goodness and natural wisdom. The practice of Contemplative Psychotherapy grew out of a dialogue between Tibetan Buddhist master Chogyam Trungpa Rinpoche and Western psychologists and psychiatrists.  This discussion led to the opening of the Contemplative Psychotherapy Department at Naropa University in 1978 by Edward M. Podvoll, a psychiatrist, psychoanalyst and dedicated student of Trungpa.

Contemplative psychotherapy may be said to have two parents: the 2,500-year-old wisdom tradition of Buddhism and the clinical traditions of Western Psychology, especially the Humanistic school.  Like all offspring it has much in common with both of its parents and yet is uniquely itself at the same time.  From Buddhism comes the practice of mindfulness/awareness meditation, together with a highly sophisticated understanding of the functioning of the mind in sanity and in confusion.  From Western psychology come the investigation of the stages of human development, a precise language for discussing mental disturbance and the intimate method of working with others known as "psychotherapy". The root teaching of the contemplative psychotherapy program is the notion of "brilliant sanity".  This means that we all have within us a natural dignity and wisdom. Practitioners of contemplative psychotherapy become experts at recognizing sanity within even the most confused and distorted states of mind and are trained to nurture this sanity in themselves and in their clients.

Core ideas

Brilliant sanity

The basic premise of contemplative psychotherapy rests on the notion of "brilliant sanity", which suggests that we all have within us a natural dignity and wisdom and that our basic nature is characterized by clarity, openness, and compassion. This wisdom may be temporarily covered over, but it is there and may be cultivated. Practitioners of contemplative psychotherapy become experts at recognizing sanity within even the most confused and distorted states of mind and are trained to nurture this sanity in themselves and in their clients.

Contemplative practice
Buddhist psychology emphasizes the primacy of immediate experience. In the training of a contemplative psychotherapist, theoretical training is balanced with experiential training. By studying and experiencing his or her own mind, the contemplative therapist can then study and experience accurately the mind of others while engaging in therapeutic practices. The study of one's own mind can be achieved through meditation practice and body/mind awareness disciplines.

Maitri space awareness

Space awareness practice is designed to intensify and familiarize oneself with different
emotional and psychological states: both the "wisdom" aspects and the confused aspects. Maitri space awareness practice, when integrated with sitting meditation within a community environment, can assist practitioners in recognizing their own patterns, become friendly toward themselves in different states of mind, and develop genuine humor and compassion toward themselves and others. This often leads to relaxation and fearlessness in working with others.

Body, speech and mind practice

Contemplative psychotherapy makes use of the Body-Speech-Mind approach to clinical supervision as a way to bring the client, the client's world and the therapeutic relationship (as experienced by the contemplative psychotherapist) vividly into the group supervisory situation. This presence in turn is used to directly facilitate working with energetic and conceptual obstacles and provides a basis for subsequent therapeutic interventions.

References

Psychotherapies
Mindfulness (Buddhism)
Mindfulness (psychology)